Power Rangers Wild Force is a video game based on the television series of the same name, developed by THQ for the Game Boy Advance in 2002.

Gameplay
The player plays as one of six Rangers. Back up Rangers can be summoned for additional attack power throughout each level. The player fights Putrids until encountering the final boss in each level. After defeating the boss, the boss grows to giant size, and the player selects a Megazord combination to fight the large monster, in a series of Quick time Events. The game is played across 12 levels. Passwords are provided at the end of each level, allowing the player to resume a specific level by entering the correct password. A Battle Mode allows for up to four players to compete against each other.

Reception

The game received “mixed or average reviews” according to the review aggregator Metacritic.

References  

2002 video games
Action video games
Game Boy Advance-only games
THQ games
Natsume (company) games
Power Rangers video games
Power Rangers Wild Force
Video games featuring female protagonists
Game Boy Advance games
Superhero video games
Video games developed in Japan